Russell Erxleben (born January 13, 1957) is a former American football player and currency investor. He shares the record for the longest successful field goal in NCAA history at 67 yards (with tee), which he set in 1977 while playing for the University of Texas. Erxleben was a three-time All-America punter (1976, 1977, and 1978). He was drafted in the first round of the NFL Draft, an extremely rare occurrence for a kicker. After an NFL career lasting six years, he became a currency investor. Convicted of securities fraud in 1999, he was released from federal prison in 2005.  He was again convicted of investment fraud in 2014 and sentenced to 90 months ( years) in federal prison.

Early years
Erxleben was raised in the small city of Seguin, Texas, located about 35 miles (55 km) east of San Antonio, where he was a stand-out as a high school kicker. He had a conventional straight-on kicking style, using a two-step approach. Highly recruited, he entered the University of Texas as a top prospect in 1975.

Texas
Erxleben quickly earned a reputation as a reliable kicker for the Longhorns. In December of his freshman year, he played in the Bluebonnet Bowl against Colorado. Despite early troubles in the game, including a missed field goal and a blocked extra point, Erxleben kicked a field goal late in the game, breaking the tie and securing the win for Texas.

In 1977, in a game against Rice University, he set the record for the longest field goal in NCAA history with a 67-yard kick (with tee). UT head coach Fred Akers said of the kick, "It was like a gunshot. We couldn't believe a ball was going that far. It had another eight yards on it."  Erxleben kicked two other field goals over 60 yards that season. Rule changes in NCAA football since 1977, specifically the prohibition of kicking tees for field goals, as well as changes to the placement of the ball following a failed kick, have discouraged such long attempts, thus attempts to break the record are now rare. The longest field goal since the rule changes came in 1998 when Martin Gramatica of Kansas State made a 65-yard attempt.

Erxleben is the only three-time All-American punter in NCAA history, being a consensus choice in 1976, 1977, and 1978.

Professional playing career
In 1979 he was unexpectedly drafted in the first round (11th pick overall) by the New Orleans Saints. At the time this was the second highest selection of a kicker in the draft, with the highest drafted kicker being Charlie Gogolak. The Saints hoped to save a roster spot by having him perform both the place-kicking and punting duties, despite having solid veterans in both positions (Rich Szaro at placekicker and Tom Blanchard at punter). He played six seasons in the NFL, primarily as a punter. Despite his stellar college career, he did not make the Pro Bowl during his NFL career.

In Erxleben's first NFL game, on September 2, 1979, the Saints and the archrival Atlanta Falcons went into overtime with the score 34–34. Midway through overtime, a snap went over Erxleben's head and rolled to the goal line. Erxleben picked the ball up and made a hurried chest pass. The pass was intercepted by Atlanta's James Mayberry at the 6-yard line, and he trotted into the end zone for a touchdown and a 40–34 Falcon victory.

The next week in Milwaukee, Erxleben pulled the hamstring in his right leg, forcing the Saints to use fullback Tony Galbreath as their emergency placekicker and wide receiver Wes Chandler at punter vs. the Green Bay Packers. The Saints lost 28–19, and later that week, coach Dick Nolan was forced to sign Garo Yepremian and then Rick Partridge to handle the kicking/punting chores in Erxleben's extended absence over the remainder of the season.  New Orleans finished the year at 8–8, one game behind the Los Angeles Rams, who won the division and played in Super Bowl XIV.
 
Following his disappointing rookie season, Erxleben missed a game-tying field goal attempt in the 1980 season opener, resulting in a 26–23 loss to the San Francisco 49ers, a team that had won a total of four games over the previous two seasons. The loss was the first of 14 consecutive defeats for the Saints, who ended the year 1–15.

In 1982 the Saints drafted Morten Andersen, who would be the team's placekicker for the next 13 seasons.

Erxleben was New Orleans's union representative during the 1982 NFL players' strike.

The Saints released him in 1984 after drafting his replacement, Brian Hansen. After four years out of football, he attempted a comeback with the Detroit Lions, but retired for good in 1988.

Legal issues
After retiring from the NFL, he became a financial investor in foreign exchange trading, founding Austin Forex International in Austin, Texas. In 1999, following a tip, an investigation by the Texas State Securities Board and the Internal Revenue Service ensued; and Erxleben eventually pleaded guilty to one count of conspiracy to commit securities fraud, mail fraud and money laundering, and a second count for securities fraud in connection with misleading statements regarding the past performance of Austin Forex. On September 18, 2000, Erxleben was sentenced by United States District Court Judge James R. Nowlin to 84 months in prison and ordered to pay a total of $28 million in restitution with a $1 million fine. Erxleben's lawyers, the law firm of Locke, Liddell & Sapp, settled a related lawsuit for $22 million in 2000. Other law firms settled and a total of $34 million  was collected in the combined suits.

On January 24, 2013, Erxleben was arrested again on various federal charges related to an alleged Ponzi scheme. In December 2013 Erxleben pleaded guilty to charges of wire fraud and money laundering. On February 24, 2014, he was sentenced to 90 months in prison. Erxleben, United States Bureau of Prisons register number 04048-180, was released from custody on 19 July 2019.

See also
List of Texas Longhorns football All-Americans
List of New Orleans Saints first-round draft picks

References

Notes

External links
NFL playing stats
Austin Business Journal: Erxleben Pleads Guilty in Fraud Case

American football placekickers
New Orleans Saints players
Players of American football from Austin, Texas
Texas Longhorns football players
Detroit Lions players
1957 births
Living people
American money launderers
All-American college football players
American people convicted of fraud
American currency traders
American sportspeople convicted of crimes